Cathro may refer to
an unincorporated community in Maple Ridge Township, Alpena County, Michigan, U.S.
Ian Cathro (born 1986), Scottish football coach
Warwick Cathro (born 1948), Australian librarian